Dallas Crutcher Long (born June 13, 1940) is a retired American track and field athlete, who mostly competed in the shot put. Between 1959 and 1964 he set six official and five unofficial world records.  His first was at the 1959 Santa Barbara Easter Relays, the last in 1964 in the USA vs USSR dual meet. Long attended the University of Southern California.  He competed at the 1960 Summer Olympics, where he won a bronze medal behind fellow Americans Bill Nieder and Parry O'Brien. One of his coaches was Frantisek (Frank) Louda, an American-Czech who had held the European hammer throw record in the 1930s. Long returned four years later to Tokyo for the 1964 Summer Olympics and won a gold medal. Domestically he won the AAU title in 1961 and the NCAA title in 1960–62.

While a senior at North High School in Phoenix, Arizona, he set the National High School Record in the shot put.  He was Track and Field News "High School Athlete of the Year" in 1958.

Long's best mark in the shot put was a then-world record of 20.68 meters (67'10½") set at the U.S.-U.S.S.R. dual meet in 1964. 

After retiring from competitions Long became a dentist and a physician specializing in emergency medicine. He served as a defense witness in the Rodney King trial against the Los Angeles Police Department police officers Laurence Powell and Stacey Koon in early 1993. In 1996 he was inducted into the National Track and Field Hall of Fame.

As of 2020, Dallas lives in Whitefish, Montana with his wife Suzanne.

References

External links 

 
 
 
 
 Image of children watching Dallas Long conduct dental examinations, Los Angeles, California,1965. Los Angeles Times Photographic Archive (Collection 1429). UCLA Library Special Collections, Charles E. Young Research Library, University of California, Los Angeles.

1940 births
Living people
American dentists
American male shot putters
Athletes (track and field) at the 1959 Pan American Games
Athletes (track and field) at the 1960 Summer Olympics
Athletes (track and field) at the 1964 Summer Olympics
Olympic gold medalists for the United States in track and field
Olympic bronze medalists for the United States in track and field
Sportspeople from Pine Bluff, Arkansas
World record setters in athletics (track and field)
University of Southern California alumni
Track and field athletes from Arizona
Medalists at the 1964 Summer Olympics
Medalists at the 1960 Summer Olympics
Pan American Games silver medalists for the United States
Pan American Games medalists in athletics (track and field)
North High School (Phoenix, Arizona) alumni
Medalists at the 1959 Pan American Games